For other mountains with the same name, see Black Mountain. Should not be confused with Black Mountain, Union County, Georgia.

Black Mountain is located in Georgia USA on the boundary between Dawson and Gilmer counties. The summit is the highest point in Dawson County.  It is in the Chattahoochee National Forest and is part of the Blue Ridge Wildlife Management Area.

Geography
Black Mountain is located on the border of Dawson and Gilmer counties. Its elevation is about 3,600 feet. The mountain is located about 4 miles north of Amicalola Falls State Park, 14 miles northwest of Dahlonega and 17 miles east/southeast of Ellijay. Other nearby geographical features include Nimblewill Gap, Frosty Mountain and Tickanetley Creek.

Hiking
Black Mountain can be reached via the Appalachian Approach Trail. It is a  hike north from Amicalola Falls State Park, a  hike north from Nimblewill Gap, and a  hike south from Springer Mountain on the trail.

References

External links

Mountains of Georgia (U.S. state)
Landforms of Dawson County, Georgia
Mountains of Gilmer County, Georgia
Chattahoochee-Oconee National Forest